Hamid Babazadeh (born 2 February 1964 in Tehran) is a retired Iranian goalkeeper and current a goalkeeping coach and in the recent years at Esteghlal He was formerly goalkeeping coach of Steel Azin, Sepahan, Saipa and Iran national football team and was most worked with Amir Ghalenoei.

Team Melli (National team) 
Babazadeh was a reserve goalkeeper for the Iran national football team at the 1988 AFC Asian Cup finals in Qatar.

References 

1964 births
Living people
Iranian footballers
Association football goalkeepers
Esteghlal F.C. players
Iranian football managers